Dayanidhi Murasoli Maran (born 5 December 1966) is an Indian politician and one of the prominent members of Dravida Munnetra Kazhagam party. He was elected thrice as a Member of Parliament to Lok Sabha from Chennai Central constituency during the 2004 general elections, 2009 general elections & 2019 general elections.

He is the son of former Union Minister Murasoli Maran and the grandnephew of former Tamil Nadu Chief Minister and former DMK president M. Karunanidhi. He is the younger brother of Indian billionaire Kalanithi Maran, the founder, chairman and of Sun Group. He is married to Priya, and has a daughter and a son.

Maran has wide exposure in the fields of media, television, cable technology, political economy and management and has been a delegate at many international seminars and conferences in various countries.

Early life

Dayanidhi is the second son of ex-minister Murasoli Maran, who had been the Commerce and Industrial minister. He is also the grandnephew of DMK president and ex-chief minister of Tamil Nadu M Karunanidhi. He is the younger brother of Kalanidhi Maran, the founder and managing director of Sun Network. He had his schooling with Don Bosco, Egmore, Chennai. He received initial education in Tamil Nadu and graduated in Economics from Loyola College in Chennai. He also attended the "Owner /President Management Programme" (OPM) from Harvard Business School (USA). The Owner/President Management Programme is meant for business owners/founders.
Dayanidhi is married to Priya of "The Hindu" family. Priya is the daughter of Ramesh Rangarajan, Director Kasturi & Sons and the pair have a daughter named Divya and a son named Karan.

Tenure as an MP and Union minister

He contested from Central Chennai Constituency in Tamil Nadu as a DMK party candidate and been elected thrice during the 2004, 2009 & 2019 elections as member of parliament.

During the 2004 elections, his winning margin was over  votes and he received 62% of the total votes polled. He was appointed Union Minister for Communications and Information Technology on 26 May 2004. During his tenure as IT and Telecommunication Minister the call rates of mobiles and landlines were drastically reduced which in-turn influenced the growth of subscriptions.However during 2004 to 2006 he allegedly installed telephone exchange at his private residence to facilitate the business transactions of Sun TV owned by his brother Karunanidhi Maran During the tenure, he was instrumental in garnering a large amount of Foreign Direct Investments into Communication and Information Technology Sector. Many multinational telecom companies including Nokia, Motorola, Ericsson, Flextronics and Dell set up units in the country. His ministry set and achieved a target of 250 million connections in Dec 2007 to December 2010, against 75 million in May 2004.

During the 2009 elections he won by a margin of 33,454 votes and he received 46.82% of the total votes polled.

During the 2019 Lok Sabha Elections, he once again contested from the Chennai Central Parliamentary Constituency, winning it for the 3rd time, polling a stunning 4,48,911 votes and defeated the other contestants with a record-breaking victory margin of 3,01,520 votes.

Elections contested

Notes

References

External links
QRZ Ham Radio Callsign Database – VU2DMK
National Institute of Amateur Radio
Official biographical sketch in Parliament of India website

Dravida Munnetra Kazhagam politicians
India MPs 2004–2009
India MPs 2009–2014
Indian amateur radio operators
Members of the Cabinet of India
1966 births
Living people
Members of Parliament from Tamil Nadu
Union Ministers from Tamil Nadu
Loyola College, Chennai alumni
Don Bosco schools alumni
India MPs 1999–2004
Lok Sabha members from Tamil Nadu
Candidates in the 2014 Indian general election
2G spectrum case
Karunanidhi family
Politicians from Chennai
India MPs 2019–present